Dolichoderus omicron is a species of ant in the genus Dolichoderus. Described by Shattuck and Marsden in 2013, the species is endemic to Australia, being found in sem-arid regions and can be seen foraging during the day in columns on the ground surface. Colonies of this species can be found under rocks in soil.

References

Dolichoderus
Hymenoptera of Australia
Insects described in 2013